São Vicente Island (São Paulo, Brazil) is an island in São Paulo state, Brazil. It has an area of 57.4 km2 and a population of 760,000 people. The population density is 13,240/ km2, making it the most densely populated island in Brazil, and the 38th most densely populated island in the world. Parts of the cities of São Vicente and Santos are located on the island. The former sugar cane facility, Engenho dos Erasmos is situated here.

Atlantic islands of Brazil
Baixada Santista
Landforms of São Paulo (state)